Euloge Mèmè Placca Fessou (born 31 December 1994) is a Togolese footballer who plays as a forward for Belarusian club Shakhtyor Soligorsk. He also plays as an international for Togo.

External links 
 
 

1994 births
Living people
21st-century Togolese people
Togolese footballers
Association football forwards
Togo international footballers
OC Agaza players
Servette FC players
Lierse Kempenzonen players
K Beerschot VA players
Al Tadhamon SC players
FC Shakhtyor Soligorsk players
Challenger Pro League players
2013 Africa Cup of Nations players
Togolese expatriate footballers
Expatriate footballers in Switzerland
Expatriate footballers in Belgium
Expatriate footballers in Kuwait
Expatriate footballers in Belarus
Togolese expatriate sportspeople in Belgium
Togolese expatriate sportspeople in Kuwait
Togolese expatriate sportspeople in Switzerland
Kuwait Premier League players